Hypnotic Underworld is an album by the band Ghost, released on January 27, 2004, on Drag City. The album is the first album to feature cellist/bassist Takuyuki Moriya and percussionist Junzo Tatewia, who replaced Hiromichi Sakamoto and Setsuko Furuya respectively.

The album has two cover songs: one of Earth and Fire's "Hazy Paradise" and one of Syd Barrett's "Dominoes".

Track listing

Personnel
The following people contributed to Hypnotic Underworld:

Ghost
Masaki Batoh – acoustic guitar, vocals, 12-string acoustic guitar
Michio Kurihara – electric guitar
Takuyuki Moriya - electric bass, double bass, cello
Kazuo Ogino – organ, piano, lute, Mellotron, Korg synthesizer, Celtic harp
Taishi Takizawa – bouzouki, flute, saxophone, theremin, tin whistle
Junzo Tatewia – percussion, drums

Additional personnel
Masaki Hayashi - Engineer
Ichiyusai Kuniyoshi - Artwork
Kazuo Ogino - Photography
Dan Osborn - Cover layout
Keiko Yoshida - Photography

Reception

Hypnotic Underworld has received mostly positive reviews. On the review aggregate site Metacritic, the album has a score of 78 out of 100, indicating "Generally favorable reviews."

AllMusic's Sean Westergaard gave the album a very positive review, writing "Hypnotic Underworld is a new high-water mark from one of rock's most interesting bands. Highly recommended." Brandon Stosuy from Pitchfork also praised the album, writing "Much more could be said, but it's more important to state plainly, in barest terms, that Ghost have emerged as one of the most formidable (and important) rock bands I know. And Hypnotic Underworld is their rollicking masterwork." Shaking Through called the album "another worthy addition to the group's idiosyncratic catalog." Stylus Magazine's Dave Segal, while criticizing the album for meandering too long and Masaki Batoh's vocals, concluded his review with "Still, I’d rather hear Ghost’s overreaching ambition and exploratory excess than the stunted machinations of most current indie rock."

References

External links
Hypnotic Underworld at Metacritic
Drag City page on Hypnotic Underworld

2004 albums
Ghost (1984 band) albums
Drag City (record label) albums